Boechera breweri is a species of flowering plant in the family Brassicaceae known by the common name Brewer's rockcress.

Distribution
The plant is native to northern California and southern Oregon.

It grows in rocky areas in mountains and valleys, including in the northern Sierra Nevada and the Klamath Mountains.

Description

Boechera breweri is a perennial herb growing from a woody, branching caudex. It produces hairy, erect stems to up to about 20 centimeters tall. There is a basal clump of leaves around the caudex. They are oval-shaped and up to 3 centimeters long. They are coated in forked hairs. There are also a few leaves farther up the plant with bases that clasp the stem.

The flowers have dark purple sepals and lighter purple petals. The fruit is a long, thin, ascending silique up to 6.5 centimeters long. The flowers have thick pinkish-purple sepals and spoon-shaped pink to purple petals.

The fruit is a long, narrow, purple silique which may be many centimeters long.

External links
Calflora Database: Boechera breweri (Brewer's rock cress)
 Jepson Manual eFlora (TJM2) treatment of Boechera breweri
USDA Plants Profile for Boechera breweri (Brewer's rock cress)
UC Photos gallery — Boechera breweri

breweri
Flora of California
Flora of Oregon
Flora of the Klamath Mountains
Flora of the Sierra Nevada (United States)
Natural history of the California chaparral and woodlands
Natural history of the California Coast Ranges
Plants described in 1876
Flora without expected TNC conservation status